Dipak Chatterjee is a fictional detective character created by Bengali writer Samarendranath Pandey under his pen name Swapan Kumar. The series of his stories were well-known in the sub altern culture of Kolkata and most popular pulp fiction to readers of Bengali literature.

Character 
The first story of Dipak Chatterjee, Adrishya Sanket, was published in 1953. Dipak is a private investigator of Kolkata, British India. The police often seek help from him. Adventurous Dipak even goes abroad for solving cases. He can use revolvers with both hands and is an expert in martial arts. Dipak has profound scientific knowledge and has set up a laboratory in his house to carry out scientific experiments. His assistant, Ratanlal, usually accompanies him. Most of the stories are set in colonial Bengal. A total of 20 series of Dipak Chatterjee stories were published over three decades.

Selected series 
Rahasya Kuhelika series
Crime World series
Dragon series
Bajpakhi Series
Biswachakra series
Kalrudra series
Kalnagini series

Adaptation 
Pradipta Bhattacharya, a National Award winning Bengali filmmaker wants to make a films based on the story of Dipak Chatterjee. According to the director there were some copyright related problems.

References 

Fictional Bengali people
Fictional private investigators
Fictional Indian people
Culture of Kolkata